Sandra Lynn Wolin is an American microbiologist and physician-scientist specialized in biogenesis, function, and turnover of non-coding RNA. She is chief of the RNA Biology Laboratory at the National Cancer Institute.

Education 
Wolin completed an A.B. in Biochemical Sciences from Princeton University. She earned a M.D. from the Yale School of Medicine and a Ph.D. degree from the department of molecular biophysics and biochemistry at Yale University. Her 1985 dissertation was titled, The Ro Small Cytoplasmic Ribonucleoproteins of Mammalian Cells. Wolin's doctoral advisor was Joan A. Steitz. She carried out postdoctoral training with Peter Walter at the University of California, San Francisco, where she devised an early ribosome profiling method.

Career 
Wolin returned to the Yale School of Medicine as an assistant professor, and rose to the rank of professor in the departments of cell biology and molecular biophysics and biochemistry. From 2014-2017, she served as director of the Yale Center for RNA Science and Medicine. She joined the National Cancer Institute (NCI) in 2017 as chief of the newly formed RNA Biology Laboratory. She heads the section on non-coding RNAs and ribonucleoprotein particles (RNPs).

Research 
Wolin's research examines how noncoding RNAs function, how cells recognize and degrade defective RNAs and how failure to degrade these RNAs affects cell function and contributes to human disease. Wolin studies the biogenesis, function, and turnover of non-coding RNAs. Her laboratory has identified proteins that recognize misfolded and otherwise defective RNAs. By studying a bacterial ortholog of one such protein, the ring-shaped Ro60 autoantigen, they discovered that this protein is tethered by noncoding "Y RNA" to a ring-shaped nuclease, forming a double-ringed ribonucleoprotein machine specialized for structured RNA degradation. The laboratory is characterizing this new RNA degradation machine, identifying additional roles for Ro60 and Y RNA in both human cells and bacteria, and uncovering other pathways by which defective and damaged RNAs are recognized and degraded.

Awards and honors 
Wollin is an elected fellow of the American Association for the Advancement of Science and American Academy of Microbiology.

Selected works

References

External links
 

Year of birth missing (living people)
Living people
Fellows of the American Association for the Advancement of Science
21st-century American biologists
Yale School of Medicine alumni
National Institutes of Health people
21st-century American women scientists
21st-century American women physicians
21st-century American physicians
Princeton University alumni
Yale School of Medicine faculty
American microbiologists
Women microbiologists
Cancer researchers
American medical researchers
Women medical researchers
Fellows of the American Academy of Microbiology
American women academics
Physician-scientists